The IFAF Europe Champions League was a European Cup-inspired tournament for European Gridiron teams affiliated to IFAF Europe. It has been held annually between 2014 and 2016.

History 
In 2014, the IFAF Europe Champions League was formed in the same year the BIG6 European Football League initiated. The format involved 13 teams from Europe. The Group Stage format borrowed from the IFAF World Championship while the Final Four format came from the NCAA Division I men's basketball tournament.

After the 2016 season the competition was replaced by the IFAF Northern European Football League 2017. The number of participating teams was reduced to 5, all from Northern Europe.

Champions

Championship Winners

Conference Champions

Teams

See also
BIG6 European Football League
IFAF Europe

References

External links 
IFAF Europe Online

Sports leagues established in 2014
2014 establishments in Europe
American football leagues in Europe
IFAF competitions